Endotricha euphiles is a species of snout moth in the genus Endotricha. It was described by Turner in 1932, and is known from northern Queensland, Australia.

References

Moths described in 1932
Endotrichini